Holy Trinity Church, Tarleton is an Anglican church which stands in the village of Tarleton, Lancashire, England.

The church was built in 1886 to replace the old St Mary's Church on the edge of the village, which was no longer big enough for the local population to attend.
The cost to build Holy Trinity was £6,138. The steeple and bells cost £2,600. The repair of the steeple in 1968 cost £3,500.

References

19th-century Church of England church buildings
Churches completed in 1886
Tarleton, Holy Trinity Church
Churches in the Borough of West Lancashire